Chaudhry Moonis Elahi (born 12 April 1976) is a Pakistani politician from Punjabi Jatt Warraich family. who has been a Member of the National Assembly of Pakistan since October 2018. He was the Minister for Water Resources from 13 July 2021 till 10 April 2022 when the no-confidence motion against Imran Khan succeeded. Previously, he was a member of the Provincial Assembly of the Punjab from 2008 to May 2018.

Early life and education
Moonis Elahi Warraich was born on 12 April 1976 in Lahore, Pakistan to Chaudhry Pervaiz Elahi. He received a BBA degree in 1999 from the Wharton School of the University of Pennsylvania. After completing his education, he returned to Pakistan and joined his family business.

Political career
Elahi ran for the Provincial Assembly of the Punjab as a candidate of the Pakistan Muslim League (Q) (PML (Q)) from two constituencies (Lahore and Gujrat) in the 2008 Pakistani general election. He won the Gujrat constituency from the candidate of Pakistan Peoples Party named Ch Nasir Samma who got 37137 votes and he was unsuccessful in the Lahore constituency where he lost the seat to a candidate of the Pakistan Muslim League (N). He served as a member of the following Standing Committees in Punjab Assembly for the term 2008-2013:

 Standing Committee on Commerce and Investment.

Elahi ran for the Provincial Assembly of the Punjab as a candidate of the PML (Q) from two constituencies (Mandi Bahauddin and Gujrat) in the 2013 Pakistani general election and was successful in both. He vacated the Mandi Bahauddin seat to retain his native seat in Gujrat.

He has been a fierce advocate for the Kalbagh Dam Project. Moonis Elahi is also an outspoken advocate for action against climate change and environmental degradation. Elahi has recently urged the Government of Pakistan to include Environmental Education as a priority subject in the new national curriculum. In December 2019, Elahi announced his party's first environmental policy.

In September 2018, he was allocated PML-Q ticket to contest a by-election from Constituency NA-69 (Gujrat-II).

He was elected to the National Assembly of Pakistan as a candidate of PML-Q from Constituency NA-69 (Gujrat-II) in by-election held on 14 October 2018.

He is serving as a member of the following Standing Committees in National Assembly for the term 2018-2023:

 Standing Committee on Parliamentary Affairs
 Standing Committee on Privatization
 Standing Committee on Water Resources

After the 2018 Pakistani general election, Pakistan Muslim League (Q) under an agreement had joined the PTI led coalition government. In 2019, differences surfaced between the two coalition partners when PMLQ complained of delay in implementation of the terms in the agreement. Elahi met with Prime Minister Imran Khan in a bid to solve the differences. In this meeting the PM asked Elahi for continued PMLQ support to the Punjab Chief Minister Sardar Usman Buzdar. Later during a TV talk show Elahi denied rumors of any PTI-Q coalition split. However, the deadlock between the coalition partners persists.

On February 10, 2020, the Pakistan Tehreek-e-Insaf and Pakistan Muslim League (Q) leaders met to resolve the issues. Later Moonis Elahi tweeted that PMLQ and PTI alliance will continue. And On July 13, PM Imran Khan has made Moonis, The Federal Minister for Water Resources.

Federal Minister for Water Resources 
On 19 July 2021, Moonis Elahi was sworn in as Federal Minister for Water Resources. President Arif Alvi administered the oath.

Left PML (Q) & Joining PTI 
On 21 February 2023, He left PML (Q) & joined Pakistan Tehreek-e-Insaf PTI along with his Father Chaudhry Pervaiz Elahi and other ten former MPAs of Pakistan Muslim League (Q) (PML Q) over political rifts with the president of PML (Q) Chaudhry Shujaat Hussain.

NICL corruption scandal

In 2010, Elahi was accused of corruption of Rs 320 million in the NICL scandal during his father's tenure as the Chief Minister of Punjab. Elahi denied the charges levelled against him. He was declared a proclaimed offender for failure to appear before the investigation committee and as a result, he was arrested and jailed. He was later acquitted in 2011 due to inconclusive evidence and in 2012 all charges in the regard were dropped. Accountability court on 2 January 2020, observing that the prosecution had failed to bring on record any evidence acquitted all others accused in the NICL scandal.

A report stated that Elahi had declared the value of his assets at not more than Rs 0.5 million in 2007. However, in 2009, he had assets worth over Rs 700 million.

In 2016, he was named in the Panama Papers for having offshore bank accounts outside Pakistan. However his father claimed that Elahi had nothing to do with offshore accounts. In 2017, National Accountability Bureau begin fresh investigation into Elahi's wealth.

In January 2021, National Accountability Bureau told the Lahore High Court that pending inquiries against MNA Moonis Elahi and his family members had been closed for lack of evidence.

External Link

More Reading
 List of members of the 15th National Assembly of Pakistan

References

Living people
1976 births
Moonis
Punjabi people
Politicians from Gujrat, Pakistan
Pakistan Muslim League (Q) MNAs
Pakistani MNAs 2018–2023
Punjab MPAs 2008–2013
Punjab MPAs 2013–2018
Wharton School of the University of Pennsylvania alumni
People named in the Panama Papers
Pakistan Muslim League (Q) MPAs (Punjab)
Pakistani prisoners and detainees
Pakistanis named in the Pandora Papers